Ursula Valenta (born 17 July 1951) is an Austrian archer.

Archery

Valenta competed at the 1978 and 1982 World Field Archery Championships winning a silver and bronze medal respectively in the freestyle women's individual event.

She took part in three World Archery Championships with a highest finish of eighteenth.

At the 1984 Summer Olympic Games she came 32nd with 2395 points scored in the women's individual event.

References

External links 
 Profile on worldarchery.org

1951 births
Living people
Austrian female archers
Olympic archers of Austria
Archers at the 1984 Summer Olympics